Triple fff Brewery is a small independent brewer of real ale based in Four Marks, Hampshire, England, founded in September 1997. They produce award winning beers of styles including bitters, milds and stouts. They own three pubs, the Railway Arms in Alton, The White Lion in Aldershot and The Artillery Arms in Portsmouth.

Triple fff was launched by Graham Trott, and his partner Frank. They installed a five barrel plant in one of the units vacated by the now closed Magpie Furniture factory on Station Approach in the village of Four Marks. Graham (a skilled Cabinet Maker by trade) started his career at Magpie Furniture and once the company closed down, he saw an opportunity to turn his hobby into a profession.

Graham and Frank took a musical theme for their brewery. Naming it Triple fff which stands for fortississimo and means "very very loud". Franks share of the business was bought out after a few years by Graham. 

The beer names came from song titles of 1960's rock icons, Van Morrison, Led Zeppelin and Cream with Moondance (4.2%ABV), Stairway (4.6%ABV) and Pressed Rat and Warthog (3.8%ABV). Other beer names brewed by Triple fff include Midnight Rambler, Hunky Dory and Comfortably Numb.

The year 2000 saw an expansion into an 18 Barrel plant and in 2006 the brewery became a 50 Barrel system brewing over 31,000 pints a week and opened their onsite shop. In November 2017 the brewery launched their onsite bar.

The brewery produces real ale and has won over 50 awards, including overall Champion Beer of Britain at the Campaign for Real Ale (CAMRA) Great British Beer Festival.
Their beers include:
Moondance - one of their original beers and champion Best Bitter of Britain 2002 when it also won the bronze award in the overall competition.  In 2006 it won silver in the Best Bitter category.
Alton's Pride - a golden brown session bitter which gained the bronze award in the Bitter category at Olympia in 2003 and 2004 and the overall Champion Beer of Britain award in 2008.
Pressed Rat and Warthog - champion Mild of Britain 2002
Stairway - a pale brown ale
Little Red Rooster - a rich, dark beer from a combination of pale and dark malts

Triple fff also produce a beer from a recipe by Gilbert White, the famous naturalist born in 1720 in nearby Selborne. The recipe uses hops and smoked barley.

References

Companies based in Hampshire
Breweries in England
British companies established in 1997
Food and drink companies established in 1997
1997 establishments in England